The 2001–02 Croatian Football Cup was the eleventh edition of Croatia's football knockout competition. Dinamo Zagreb were the defending champions, who retained the title beating Varteks in the final.

Calendar

Preliminary round

First round

Second round

Quarter-finals

|}

Semi-finals

First legs

Second legs

Varteks won 2–1 on aggregate.

Dinamo Zagreb won 3–2 on aggregate.

Final

First leg

Second leg

Dinamo Zagreb won 2–1 on aggregate.

See also
2001–02 Croatian First Football League
2001–02 Croatian Second Football League

External links
Official website 
2001–02 in Croatian football at Rec.Sport.Soccer Statistics Foundation

Croatian Football Cup seasons
Croatian Cup, 2001-02
Croatian Cup, 2001-02